is a Shinto shrine located on Aoshima Island, Miyazaki prefecture, Japan. It is dedicated to Hikohohodemi, Toyotama-hime and Shiozuchi-no-ōkami.

Beppyo shrines
Shinto shrines in Miyazaki Prefecture